The Montenegro national under-17 football team is the national under-17 football team of Montenegro and is controlled by the Football Association of Montenegro.  The team competes in the European Under-17 Football Championship, held every year.

UEFA European Under-17 Championship record

Current squad
 The following players were called up for the 2023 UEFA European Under-17 Championship qualification matches.
 Match dates: 20–26 October 2022
 Opposition: ,  and 
Caps and goals correct as of: 2 June 2022, after the match against

References

External links
 Football Association of Montenegro 
 JadranSport.org - South-Eastern European football news coverage 
 UEFA.com (Montenegro) 
 U-17 football team on FSCG website 

Under-17
European national under-17 association football teams